Stanton Chare is a hamlet in St Edmundsbury district, Suffolk, England. It is near the large village of Stanton. The A143 road and B1111 road are nearby.

Hamlets in Suffolk
Borough of St Edmundsbury